Murder on a Sunday Morning (lit. An Ideal Culprit) is a 2001 documentary film directed by Jean-Xavier de Lestrade. Its subject is the Brenton Butler case, a criminal case in which a fifteen-year-old African-American boy was wrongfully accused of murder. The film won the Academy Award for Best Documentary Feature at the 74th Academy Awards in 2002.

Background
In Jacksonville, Florida, on the morning of Sunday, May 7, 2000, a tourist was murdered outside of a Ramada Inn by an unknown African-American young man. A couple of hours later, fifteen-year-old Brenton Butler was stopped and questioned by police as he was walking past the crime scene, which was not far from his house. Although Butler was shorter and younger than the description of the shooter that was initially provided by the husband of the victim, who had been standing next to his wife when she was shot, the husband identified Butler as the killer, and Butler was arrested, interrogated for twelve hours without the presence of his parents or a lawyer, and signed a confession. After this, the police seem to have stopped investigating, and Butler was charged and tried for murder without any physical evidence against him; the prosecution's case was based solely on the positive eyewitness identification and the confession, which Butler later testified he had signed due to physical coercion by police.

Summary
The film follows Butler's defense team as they build their case and present it in court. In the end, the jury only deliberates for 45 minutes before finding Butler not guilty.

Aftermath
After Butler was acquitted, the police and the prosecutors were heavily criticized by a grand jury that investigated the case and the behavior of the police.

Eventually, the Duval County sheriff was put in charge of the murder case and ordered it reopened. In 2004, someone else was convicted of the murder.

References

External links

2001 films
2001 documentary films
American documentary films
Best Documentary Feature Academy Award winners
Documentary films about law
French documentary films
History of Jacksonville, Florida
Films shot in Jacksonville, Florida
Documentary films about Florida
2000s English-language films
2000s American films
2000s French films